The second government of Fernando López Miras was formed on 1 August 2019, following the latter's election as President of the Region of Murcia by the Regional Assembly of Murcia on 26 July and his swearing-in on 29 July, as a result of the People's Party (PP) allying itself with Citizens (Cs) and mustering the external support from Vox in exchange for policy compromises following the 2019 Murcian regional election.

Until March 2021, the cabinet comprised members of the PP and Cs as well as a number of independents, to become the first coalition government to be formed in the region. From that point onwards, the government has been formed by the PP and a number of expelled members from both Cs and Vox.

Investiture

Cabinet changes
López Miras's second government saw a number of cabinet changes during its tenure:

 On 20 January 2021, López Miras announced the resignation of his health minister, Manuel Villegas, after a scandal broke out over the latter's unduly receiving a dose of the COVID-19 vaccine, skipping the legally-established vaccination protocols and procedures. He was replaced in the post on 23 January by Juan José Pedreño.
 On 18 February 2021, transparency, participation and public administration minister Beatriz Ballesteros announced her resignation citing the "loss of confidence" from the new regional leadership of the party that proposed her, Cs. The resignation was effective from 20 February. Ballesteros was replaced in her post by José Gabriel Sánchez Torregrosa on 23 February.
 On 10 March 2021, both the Spanish Socialist Workers' Party (PSOE) and Cs announced an agreement under which they would jointly bring down the PP governments in the city and the region of Murcia. In response, López Miras expelled Ana Martínez Vidal and José Gabriel Sánchez Torregrosa, as members from Cs's regional leadership, but preserved two of the party's members in the government in hopes of securing their support to thwart the no-confidence motion. On 12 March, López Miras and Isabel Franco announced an agreement whereby three out of the six Cs deputies in the region—Franco, María del Valle Miguélez and Francisco Álvarez García—would back the government in exchange for minister positions, which were formalized the next day. In response, Cs expelled all its four remaining members in the government from the party.
 On 3 April 2021, López Miras secured the parliamentary support of several rebel Vox deputies by appointing María Isabel Campuzano as new Education and Culture minister, in a government reorganization that also saw mayor of Yecla Marcos Ortuño being elected to the new Presidency, Tourism and Sports portfolio and Javier Celdrán's powers being restructured into the Economy, Finance and Digital Administration ministry.
 On 7 April 2021, Francisco Álvarez García announced his resignation as minister of Employment, Research and Universities, in order to take over the control of the Citizens's parliamentary group in the Regional Assembly of Murcia, with his portfolio being merged with that of Business and Industry minister and Spokesperson María del Valle Miguélez.
 On 18 November 2021, the Transparency, Participation and Public Administration portfolio was reorganized into the Transparency, Security and Emergencies ministry.
 On 8 February 2022, as a result of a government crisis caused by Education minister María Isabel Campuzano over her dismissal of Institute of Cultural and Arts Industries director-general, José Ramón Palazón (a trusted person of one of the Vox expelled deputies that maintained their support to the López Miras government), her portfolio was stripped of its Culture competences, which were transferred and merged into the new Presidency, Tourism, Culture and Sports ministry.
 On 11 May 2022, the Minister of Transparency, Security and Emergencies, Antonio Sánchez Lorente, resigned from his post because of personal health reasons. As a result, this Ministry was disestablished and its competences transferred to the restructured Ministries of Women, Equality, LGTBI, Families, Social Policy and Transparency (led by Isabel Franco) and Water, Agriculture, Livestock, Fisheries, Environment and Emergencies (led by Antonio Luengo).

Council of Government
The Council of Government is structured into the offices for the president of the Region of Murcia, the vice president and a number of ministries (10 from August 2019 to April 2021, 9 from April 2021 to May 2022 and 8 from May 2022).

Notes

References

2019 establishments in Murcia (region)
Cabinets established in 2019
Cabinets of Murcia (region)